The 1961–62 Nationalliga A season was the 24th season of the Nationalliga A, the top level of ice hockey in Switzerland. Eight teams participated in the league, and EHC Visp won the championship.

Regular season

Relegation

 EHC Basel-Rotweiss - HC Villars

External links
 Championnat de Suisse 1961/62

Swiss
National League (ice hockey) seasons
1961–62 in Swiss ice hockey